Assam Valley Party was founded by Muhammed Saadulah, the first Prime Minister of Assam in 1937.
It was the second largest political party after Indian National Congress during 1937–1946 in Assam. It formed government three times in Assam Province, in 1937, 1939 and in 1942.

Prime Minister of Assam

References

Islamic political parties in India
Conservative parties in India
1900s in Islam
Muslim League